Saitō, Saito, Saitou or Saitoh (written:  or ) are the 10th most common Japanese surnames respectively. Notable people with the surname include:

Overview 
, Japanese footballer
, Japanese sailor
, Japanese women's footballer
, Japanese security guard taken hostage in Iraq in 2005
, Japanese baseball player
, Japanese actress
, Japanese motorcycle racer
, Japanese professional wrestler
, Japanese idol, singer, actress and fashion model
, Japanese shogi player
, Japanese voice actress
, Japanese karateka
Ayako Saitoh (born 1956), Japanese wheelchair curler, 2010 Winter Paralympian
, Japanese playwright, director, actor and theatre producer
, Japanese manga artist
, Japanese Confucian scholar, historian, and poet
, Japanese long-distance runner
, Japanese voice actress
, Japanese drifting driver
, Japanese footballer
, Japanese footballer
, Japanese samurai and daimyō
, Japanese businessman
, Japanese basketball player
, the married name of Fusae Ohta, Japanese politician and Japan's first female prefectural governor
, Japanese swimmer
, Japanese samurai and Shinsengumi third unit captain
, Japanese professional wrestler
, Japanese softball player
, Japanese cross-country skier
Hideo Saito, a ring name of Captain New Japan (born 1982), Japanese professional wrestler
, Japanese musician
, Japanese professional wrestler
, Japanese swimmer
, Japanese basketball player
, Japanese diplomat
, Japanese footballer
, Japanese politician from Yamagata, Yamagata Prefecture
, Japanese mathematician
, Japanese politician from Tokorozawa, Saitama Prefecture
, Japanese modern pentathlete
, Japanese rower
, Japanese ski jumper
, Japanese water polo player
, Japanese teacher of aikido and son of Morihiro Saito
, Japanese singer, idol and radio personality
, Japanese speed skater
, Japanese judoka
, Japanese film score composer
, Japanese sport wrestler
James Saito (born 1955), American actor
, Japanese voice actor
, Japanese businessman
, Japanese speed skater
, Japanese footballer
Juniti Saito (born 1942), Brazilian military officer and the former commander of the Brazilian Air Force
, Japanese cyclist
, Japanese footballer
, Japanese footballer
, Japanese communist politician
, Japanese baseball player
, Japanese footballer and manager
, Japanese racewalker
, Japanese singer-songwriter
, Japanese speed skater
, Japanese actress
, Japanese women's footballer
, Japanese footballer
, Japanese politician
, better known as Hiroshi, Japanese owarai comedian
, Japanese swimmer
Kikuo Saito (1939–2016), Japanese-born American painter
, Japanese voice actress
, Japanese footballer
, better known as Daisuke Ban, Japanese actor
, Japanese printmaker
, Japanese footballer
, Japanese table tennis player
, Japanese cinematographer
, Japanese film director
, Japanese photographer
, Japanese photographer
, Japanese Paralympic athlete
, Japanese film director
, Japanese DJ and composer
, Japanese footballer
, Japanese footballer
, Japanese footballer
Kozo Saito, Japanese electrical engineer
, Japanese diplomat
, Japanese mathematician
, Japanese idol
, Japanese weightlifter
, Imperial Japanese Navy admiral, politician and Prime Minister of Japan
, Japanese graphic designer 
, also known as K-ness., Japanese professional wrestler
, Japanese sport wrestler
, Japanese footballer
, Japanese javelin thrower
, Japanese baseball player
, Japanese footballer
, better known as Masa Saito, Japanese professional wrestler
, Japanese baseball player
, Japanese footballer
, Japanese footballer
, Japanese swimmer
, Japanese sailor
, Japanese footballer
, Japanese pop singer
Mizuho Saito, the Japanese drummer of ZONE
, Japanese poet
, Japanese voice actress
Momoko Saito (cricketer) (born 1981), Japanese women cricketer
, Japanese mathematician
, Japanese aikidoka
, Japanese daimyō and monk
, Japanese model
, Japanese field hockey player
, Japanese rugby union player
, Japanese musician
, Japanese volleyball player
, Japanese rower
, Japanese weightlifter
Rie Saito (斉藤 里恵, born 1984), Japanese politician and writer
, Japanese manga artist
, Japanese professional wrestler
, Japanese footballer
, Japanese businessman and art collector
, Japanese writer
, Japanese footballer
, Japanese footballer
, Japanese footballer
, Japanese speed skater
, Japanese footballer
, Japanese writer
, Japanese kobudoka
, Japanese judoka
, Japanese footballer
, Japanese footballer
, Japanese sport shooter
, Japanese yo-yo performer and competitor
, Japanese shogi player
, Japanese biathlete
, Japanese badminton player
, Japanese actor and voice actor
, Japanese baseball player
, Japanese footballer
, Japanese footballer
, Japanese voice actress
, Japanese voice actor and singer
, Japanese actor and singer
, Japanese rower
, Japanese badminton player
Takako Saito (born 1929), Japanese artist
, Japanese sport wrestler
, Japanese manga artist
, Japanese cinematographer
, Japanese politician
, Japanese baseball pitcher
, Japanese footballer
, Japanese sumo wrestler who died due to injuries sustained in the Tokitsukaze stable hazing scandal
, Japanese weightlifter
, Japanese footballer
, Japanese ice hockey player
, Japanese mathematician
, Japanese violinist
Taki Saito (born 2000), Filipino actress
, Japanese basketball coach
, Japanese actor
Takumi Saito (racewalker) (born 1993), Japanese racewalker
, Japanese psychologist
, Japanese actor
, Japanese daimyō
, Japanese politician
, Japanese ice hockey player
, Japanese Magic: the Gathering player
, birth name of Hiro Mizushima, Japanese actor, writer and model
, Japanese samurai
Tomoyuki Saito, Japanese mixed martial artist
, Japanese film director
, Japanese footballer and manager
, Japanese samurai
, Japanese samurai
, Japanese daimyō
, Japanese politician
, Japanese comedian
, Japanese composer and arranger
William Saito (born 1971), Japanese-American businessman
, Japanese actor
, Japanese diplomat
, better known as Yakkun Sakurazuka, Japanese comedian and voice actor
, Japanese video game designer
, Japanese water polo player
, Japanese hurdler and sprinter
, Japanese gymnast
, Japanese samurai and daimyō
, Japanese general
, better known as Super Shisa, Japanese professional wrestler
, Japanese footballer
, Japanese essayist
, Japanese voice actress
, Japanese singer-songwriter, actress, essayist and poet
, Japanese baseball pitcher for the Hiroshima Toyo Carp
, Japanese baseball pitcher for the Hokkaido Nippon-Ham Fighters
, professor of philosophy at Rhode Island School of Design
, Japanese actor
, Japanese rugby union player

Fictional characters
, a character in the anime series Ghost in the Shell: Stand Alone Complex
, a character in the manga series Mitsuboshi Colors
Saito, a character in the film Inception
, a character in the OVA series Kuttsukiboshi
, a character in the novel series Sound! Euphonium
, a character in the manga series Rurouni Kenshin
, a character in the manga series Angelic Layer
, a character in the manga series Encouragement of Climb
Kaori Saito, a character in the manga series Ice Blade
, a character in the manga series Squid Girl
Saito Hikari (Hub Hikari) from the Mega Man Battle Network video game series
Shou Saito, a character in the Black Mirror episode "Playtest"
, a character in the novel series Psychic Detective Yakumo
, a character in the light novel series And You Thought There Is Never a Girl Online?

See also
Saitō Musashibō Benkei (1155–1189), Japanese warrior monk of folklore
Saitō clan, a Japanese clan during the Sengoku period

References

Japanese-language surnames